Amfreville-la-Mi-Voie is a commune in the Seine-Maritime department in the Normandy region in northern France.

Geography
A small light industrial town situated by the banks of the river Seine in the southern suburbs of Rouen at the junction of the D6015 and the D94 roads.

Population

Places of interest
 The church of St.Remi, dating from the early 20th century.
 The mairie, built in 1884.
 The Lacoste public park.

See also
Communes of the Seine-Maritime department

References

External links

Official website of the commune 

Communes of Seine-Maritime